Meroe Island is an island of India.

Administration
The island belongs to the township of Great Nicobar of Little Nicobar Taluk.

Flora and fauna
This island is known for its rich fish life.

Image gallery

References 

Islands of the Andaman and Nicobar Islands
Uninhabited islands of India
Nicobar district
Islands of India
Islands of the Bay of Bengal